Team Dauner–Akkon is a German UCI Continental team founded in 2017.

Team roster

References

External links

UCI Continental Teams (Europe)
Cycling teams based in Germany
Cycling teams established in 2017
2017 establishments in Germany